Matigara-Naxalbari Assembly constituency is an assembly constituency in Darjeeling district in the Indian state of West Bengal. It is reserved for scheduled castes.

Overview
As per orders of the Delimitation Commission, No. 25 Matigara-Naxalbari Assembly constituency (SC) covers Naxalbari community development block, and Atharakhai, Champasari (excluding villages Sitong Forest, Sivoke Hill Forest and Sivoke Forest), Matigara I, Matigara II, Patharghata gram panchayats of Matigara community development block.

Matigara-Naxalbari Assembly constituency is part of No. 4 Darjeeling (Lok Sabha constituency).

Members of Legislative Assembly

Election results

2021 Election

In the 2021 West Bengal Legislative Assembly election, Anandamoy Barman of BJP defeated his nearest rival Rajen Sundas of TMC.

2016 Election

In the 2016 West Bengal Legislative Assembly election, Sankar Malakar of Congress defeated his nearest rival Amar Sinha of TMC.

2011 Election
In the 2011 West Bengal Legislative Assembly election, Sankar Malakar of Congress defeated his nearest rival Jharen Roy of CPI(M).

References

Assembly constituencies of West Bengal
Politics of Darjeeling district